is a Japanese football coach and former player who is currently the general manager of Omiya Ardija Ventus. He is best known for leading the Japan women's national team to their first and only FIFA Women's World Cup win in 2011 over the United States on penalty kicks. He retired as head coach in March 2016 after eight years. Sasaki also coached the Japan women's U-20 national team starting in 2007.

Playing career
Sasaki studied at and played for Teikyo High School and Meiji University. At Teikyo High School, he won the national inter-high school competition as team captain. His high school club also advanced to the semi-final at the All Japan High School Soccer Tournament.

After graduating from Meiji University, Sasaki started to work for Nippon Telegraph and Telephone and joined company club NTT Kanto. He was a midfielder/defender. He contributed to the club's promotion to Japan Soccer League Division 2 in 1986.

Sasaki retired from playing at the age of 33.

Coaching career 
Sasaki served as the head coach of Japan Football League side Omiya Ardija in 1998, then took various other positions at Omiya, including the youth team head-coach and the head of development.

In 2006, Sasaki became the assistant coach of Japan women's national football team, as well as the head coach of its U-20 team. In 2008, he was promoted to the head coach of the national team, succeeding Hiroshi Ohashi.

Under Sasaki's reign, Nadeshiko won the EAFF Women's Football Championship in 2008 and again in 2010. He also led the Japan Women to a fourth-place finish at the 2008 Summer Olympics in Beijing.

Sasaki and his team won the 2011 FIFA Women's World Cup, which upset host nation Germany and then Sweden to reach the tournament final, and beat the United States 3–1 in a penalty shoot-out in the final. Nadeshiko became the 19th recipient of Japan's People's Honour Award for winning the World Cup. On 9 January 2012, Sasaki was awarded the Women's Best Coach Award in the 2011 FIFA Ballon d'Or.

At the 2012 Summer Olympics, Sasaki led Japan to their first Olympic medal, a silver, after reaching the final but losing 2–1 to the United States in the final.

At the 2015 FIFA Women's World Cup in Canada, Sasaki, who attempted to become only the 2nd coach since Vittorio Pozzo's Italian team 77 years ago to win two FIFA World Cup finals, oversaw a 2nd-place effort, as the Japanese lost 5–2 to the US in the final.

At 2016 AFC Women's Olympic Qualifying Tournament, following Japan's failure to qualify for the 2016 Olympics in Brazil, Sasaki stepped down as head coach of the team. He was succeeded by Asako Takakura.

Honours

Managerial honours
Japan Women
EAFF Women's Football Championship: 2008, 2010
Asian Games: 2010, Runner-up: 2014
FIFA Women's World Cup: 2011, Runner-up: 2015
Olympic Silver Medal: 2012
AFC Women's Asian Cup: 2014

Individual
AFC Coach of the Year: 2011
FIFA World Women's Coach of the year: 2011
Japan Football Hall of Fame: Inducted in 2019

Decorations
People's Honour Award: 2011

References

External links

1958 births
Living people
Meiji University alumni
Association football people from Yamagata Prefecture
Japanese footballers
Japan Soccer League players
Omiya Ardija players
Japanese football managers
J2 League managers
Omiya Ardija managers
Japan women's national football team managers
2011 FIFA Women's World Cup managers
2015 FIFA Women's World Cup managers
FIFA Women's World Cup-winning managers
Association football midfielders
Olympic silver medalists for Japan